The Dead Authors Podcast is an improvised comedy and faux-historical podcast hosted by Paul F. Tompkins in character as H.G. Wells, with special written material provided by Ben Zelevansky. The show ran from 2011 until 2015. In each episode, Wells collects a deceased author via his "time machine" to discuss his or her life and work. The podcast was created in support of 826LA, and all proceeds from the show are donated to the organization.

History
The podcast was recorded live on a monthly basis at the UCB Theater in Los Angeles.

When Chapter 39 was released in 2014, Tompkins announced that the podcast would be ending with Chapter 50 the following year. Tompkins commented on the show's ending in an interview with Vulture:

Yes, for a while I was able to feel like I had the energy to do several projects at once. Ultimately, some of these things I did not get paid for, they did not further my career, they were done just for fun. I suddenly remembered my career was supposed to be fun by itself. It would probably be better if I focused on my main sources of income and made those as good as I could possibly make them. It felt as if all of my projects were suffering in that I couldn't give them the time and attention that I wanted. I had to make some tough decisions and really pare it down, which would also leave room to participate in other people's things and not be having to beg off because I've over-committed myself to projects that I have created.

Episode list

''*Episode 55 marks the only episode where Paul F. Tompkins does not appear as H.G. Wells, appearing instead as the guest Mark Twain while Matt Gourley hosts the show as Carl Sagan.

Recurring guests
Several comedians made numerous appearances on the podcast, playing multiple characters. 
 Matt Gourley (7 episodes)
 Andy Daly (5 episodes)
 Chris Tallman (4 episodes)
 Hal Lublin (3 episodes)
 Jen Kirkman (3 episodes)
 Marc Evan Jackson (3 episodes)
 Brian Stack (2 episodes)
 Craig Cackowski (2 episodes)
 James Adomian (3 episodes)
 Jessica Chaffin (2 episodes)
 John Ross Bowie (2 episodes)
 Mark McConville (2 episodes)
 Scott Aukerman (2 episodes)

References

Audio podcasts
Comedy and humor podcasts
2011 podcast debuts
Cultural depictions of H. G. Wells
2015 podcast endings
Improvisational podcasts
American podcasts